Nicolae Iordache (May 23, 1902 in Teiu, Argeș – November 26, 1970 in Bucharest), known by his pseudonym Vladimir Streinu, was a Romanian literary critic, poet, essayist and translator. In 2006, he was elected a post-mortem member of the Romanian Academy.

Notes

1902 births
1970 deaths
People from Argeș County
Romanian literary critics
Romanian male poets
Romanian essayists
Romanian translators
Members of the Romanian Academy elected posthumously
20th-century translators
20th-century Romanian poets
Male essayists
20th-century essayists
20th-century Romanian male writers